The US 31–Pentwater River Bridge is a three-span steel bridge that carries Oceana Drive (Old US Highway 31) over the Pentwater River in northern Hart, Michigan. It is listed on the National Register of Historic Places.

History
Prior to the construction of the current span, US 31 spanned the river in Hart on a bridge that had become a significant bottleneck by the early 1950s. In 1954, a replacement structure was designed by the Michigan State Highway Department. The bridge was designated as a Federal Aid project and the contract for construction was awarded to Gene Fewell. The bridge was completed the next year for $266,564.

Since construction, the bridge has been altered little and has undergone repairs only for maintenance reasons. In 1988, the bridge was rehabilitated by replacing the pins and hangers of the non-redundant suspended spans. The bridge was listed on the National Register of Historic Places on December 20, 1999, and the Michigan Department of Transportation placed it on their list of historic bridges.

Design
The bridge is essentially two separate bridges, each with its own structure, separated by a  divider strip and connected by a  joint along the bridge's length.

The steel girder design of the US 31–Pentwater River Bridge was widely used by State Highway Department in the 1930s and 1940s.

See also

 List of bridges on the National Register of Historic Places in Michigan
 National Register of Historic Places listings in Oceana County, Michigan

References

Transportation in Oceana County, Michigan
Road bridges on the National Register of Historic Places in Michigan
Bridges completed in 1956
Steel bridges in the United States
U.S. Route 31
Bridges of the United States Numbered Highway System
National Register of Historic Places in Oceana County, Michigan
Cantilever bridges in the United States
Girder bridges in the United States
Buildings and structures in Oceana County, Michigan